Jang Ok-jung, Living by Love is a 2013 South Korean historical television series, starring Kim Tae-hee, Yoo Ah-in, Hong Soo-hyun and Jae Hee. Based on the 2008 novel by Choi Jung-mi, it is a reinterpretation of Jang Hui-bin's life, as a woman involved in fashion design and cosmetics-making in the Joseon Dynasty.

It aired on SBS from April 8 to June 25, 2013, on Mondays and Tuesdays at 21:55 for 24 episodes.

Cast

Main
 Kim Tae-hee as Jang Ok-jung, later the concubine, Jang Hui-bin
 Kang Min-ah as young Jang Ok-jung
 Yoo Ah-in as Lee Soon, later King Sukjong  
 Chae Sang-woo as young Lee Soon
 Hong Soo-hyun as Queen Inhyeon
 Jae Hee as Hyun Chi-soo 
 Baek Su-ho as young Hyun Chi-soo
 Lee Sang-yeob as Lee Hoon, later Prince Dongpyeong
 Kwak Dong-yeon as young Lee Hoon
 Han Seung-yeon as Choi Sui Chee Musuri, later Choi Suk-bin

Supporting

 Sung Dong-il as Jang Hyun
 Lee Hyo-jung - Min Yoo-joong
 Kim Seo-ra as Lady Yoon, Ok-jung's mother
 Go Young-bin as Jang Hee-jae
 Lee Ji-oh as young Jang Hee-jae
 Jeon In-taek as King Hyeonjong
 Kim Sun-kyung as Queen Myeongseong
 Lee Hyo-chun as Queen Jangnyeol
 Ah Young as Princess Myeongan
 Lee Dong-shin as Kim Man-ki
 Kim Ha-eun as Queen Ingyeong
 Yoon Yoo-sun as Lady Kang
 Jang Young-nam as Court lady Cheon
 Ji Yoo as Ja-kyeong
 Kim Min-ha as young Ja-kyeong
 Choi Sang-hoon as Jo Sa-seok
 Ra Mi-ran as Jo Sa-seok's wife
 Lee Hyung-chul as Prince Boksun
 Bae Jin-seob as Hyun-moo
 Lee Gun-joo as Eunuch Yang
 Kim Ga-eun as Hyang-yi
 Song Soo-hyun as young Hyang-yi
 Lee Hyo-rim as Seol-hyang
 Kim Se-in as Jung Hon-ja, northern village woman
 Kim Nan-joo as Court lady Choi
 Min Ji-ah as Hong-joo
 Yoo Sa-ra as Sol-bi
 Lee Ja-min as Yeon-hong
 Kim Soon-tae as Ui-kwan
 Lee Sa-rang as Shaman Oh-rye
 Ha Shi-eun as Shi-young
 Jang Young-joo as palace maid
 Choi Ye-ji as stepdaughter

Production
The series was written by Choi Jung-mi, based on her 2008 novel Jang Hui-bin, Living by Love. It was directed by Boo Sung-chul, who previously helmed the SBS dramas My Girlfriend is a Gumiho (2010) and Star's Lover (2009).

Yoo Ah-in's casting was announced on January 22, 2013. This is his third historical drama following Strongest Chil Woo in 2008 and Sungkyunkwan Scandal in 2010, both on KBS. The producers took into consideration the historical fact that Sukjong was younger than Jang Ok-jung, hence it made sense to cast Yoo who is five years younger than Kim Tae-hee. Yoo said "I didn't want to miss the chance to play this character. There are analogies between the character and me, so I have an affinity with the role even though everyone tried to dissuade me from taking it."

The cast and production attended their first script reading on February 1, 2013.

Ratings 
In the tables below, the blue numbers represent the lowest ratings and the red numbers represent the highest ratings.

Awards and nominations

International broadcast

References

External links
  
 
 

2013 South Korean television series debuts
2013 South Korean television series endings
Seoul Broadcasting System television dramas
Korean-language television shows
Television series set in the Joseon dynasty
South Korean historical television series
Television series by Story TV